Casa de l'Aigua is a station on line 11 of the Barcelona Metro.

Built in 2003, this single-platform station has a single level access opening onto Carrer Aiguablava.

See also
List of Barcelona Metro stations

External links
Casa de l'Aigua (trenscat.cat)

Railway stations in Spain opened in 2003
Transport in Nou Barris
Barcelona Metro line 11 stations